Recreation is an activity of leisure, one that is pursued for enjoyment or pleasure. 

Recreation may also refer to:

 Recreation (film), a 1914 film
 RéCréation, a 1999 album by Florent Pagny